Lord Howe Island Marine Park (Commonwealth waters) is a former marine protected area managed by the Commonwealth Department of the Environment, protecting the waters surrounding Lord Howe Island. It was adjacent to the 465.45 km2 Lord Howe Island Marine Park managed by the Marine Parks Authority New South Wales.  On 8 November 2012, it was replaced by a new protected area known as the Lord Howe Commonwealth Marine Reserve.

References

Marine parks of Australia
Former protected areas of the Australian government
Geography of Lord Howe Island
World Heritage Sites in Australia
Tasman Sea
Protected areas established in 2000
Protected areas disestablished in 2012